Cavewaves is an on-line collection of new-age music represented by five albums and several separate recordings, written and produced by Lee A. Spencer.

The compilation is considered to be a seminal example of what later became known as downbeat electronica.

References

External links
 

Elektra Records albums
British music websites
Online music database clients